Coin is an unincorporated community in Elko County, in the U.S. state of Nevada.

History
The first settlement at Coin was made about 1869.

References

Unincorporated communities in Elko County, Nevada